Shollenberger Park is a  wetland park located in Petaluma, California. The entirety is referred to as the "Petaluma Wetlands".

Named after Richard Shollenberger, a park chief, the park is part of one of the last wetlands of its kind in the country. It is a bird watching paradise, attracting 231 species of birds, according to the last survey, including threatened species. The Audubon Society has ranked Shollenberger Park as an important birding site, and the San Francisco Chronicle ranks it as a top destination for nature-lovers. The park is home to rare animal and plant species, such as the endangered salt marsh harvest mouse.

The park attracts 150,000 visitors annually and serves as an outdoor classroom for children as well as a wildlife research location. The Petaluma Wetlands Alliance, a 501(c)(3) environmental and educational nonprofit, does habitat restoration, gives bird and wildlife tours, and provides a third grade educational program consistent with California Educational curriculum. Point Blue Conservation Science, a non-profit wildlife conservation and research organization, is located adjacent to the park.

The area was formerly known as Cader Lane Ponds.

List of birdlife
Grebes – Clark's grebe, eared grebe, horned grebe, pied-billed grebe, western grebe
Loons – common loon, red-throated loon
Pelicans – American white pelican, brown pelican
Cormorants – double-crested cormorant
Herons, egrets, bitterns – American bittern, black-crowned night heron, great blue heron, great egret, green heron, snowy egret, cattle egret, least bittern
Ibises and spoonbills – white-faced ibis
Ducks, geese, swans – American wigeon, barrow's goldeneye, blue-winged teal, brant, bufflehead, cackling goose, Canada goose, canvasback, cinnamon teal, common goldeneye, common merganser, Eurasian wigeon, gadwall, greater scaup, greater white-fronted goose, green-winged teal, hooded merganser, lesser scaup, long-tail duck (old squaw), mallard, northern pintail, northern shoveler, redhead, red-breasted merganser, ring-necked duck, Ross' goose, ruddy duck, snow goose, surf scoter, tundra swan, white-winged scoter, wood duck
New World vultures – turkey vulture
Hawks and allies – bald eagle, Cooper's hawk, ferruginous hawk, golden eagle, northern harrier, osprey, red-shouldered hawk, red-tailed hawk, rough-legged hawk, sharp-shinned hawk, white-tailed kite
Falcons and caracaras – American kestrel, merlin, peregrine, prairie falcon
New World quail – California quail
Rails and coots – American coot, black rail, Ridgway's Rail, common moorhen, sora, Virginia Rail
Plovers and lapwings – black-bellied plover, killdeer, Pacific golden plover, semipalmated plover, snowy plover
Stilts and avocets - American avocet, black-necked stilt
Sandpipers, phalaropes, allies – Baird's sandpiper, black turnstone, dunlin, greater yellowlegs, least sandpiper, lesser yellowlegs, long-billed curlew, long-billed dowitcher, marbled godwit, pectoral sandpiper, red phalarope, red-necked phalarope, ruddy turnstone, ruff, semipalmated sandpiper, short-tailed sandpiper, short-billed dowitcher, solitary sandpiper, stilt sandpiper, spotted sandpiper, western sandpiper, whimbrel, Wilson's (common) snipe, Wilson's phalarope, willet
Gulls, terns, allies – Arctic tern, black tern, black skimmer, Bonaparte's gull, California gull, Caspian tern, common tern, elegant tern, Forster's tern, glaucous gull, glaucous-winged gull, herring gull, mew gull, Thayer's gull, western gull
Pigeons and doves – Eurasian collared dove, mourning dove, rock dove (pigeon)
Owls – barn owl, burrowing owl, great horned owl, short-eared owl
Swifts – Vaux's swift, white-throated swift
Hummingbirds – Allen's hummingbird, Anna's hummingbird
Kingfishers – belted kingfisher
Woodpeckers – acorn woodpecker, downy woodpecker, hairy woodpecker, northern flicker, Nuttall's woodpecker
Tyrant flycatchers – ash-throated flycatcher, black phoebe, Pacific-slope flycatcher, Say's phoebe, tropical kingbird, western kingbird, willow flycatcher
Shrikes – loggerhead shrike, northern shrike
Crows and jays – American crow, common raven, Steller's jay, western scrub-jay
Larks – horned lark
Swallows and martins – bank swallow, barn swallow, cliff swallow, northern rough-winged swallow, tree swallow, violet-green swallow
Chickadees and titmice – brown creeper, chestnut-backed chickadee, oak titmouse, red-breasted nuthatch, white-breasted nuthatch
Long-tailed tits – bushtit
Wrens – Bewick's wren, marsh wren, house wren
Kinglets – ruby-crowned kinglet, golden-crowned kinglet, blue-gray gnatcatcher
Thrushes – American robin, western bluebird, hermit thrush, Swainson's thrush
Mockingbirds and thrashers – northern mockingbird
Starlings and mynas – European starling
Wagtails and pipits – American pipit
Waxwings – cedar waxwing
Wood-warblers – black-throated gray warbler, chestnut-sided warbler, common yellowthroat, orange-crowned warbler, palm warbler, Townsend's warbler, Wilson's warbler, yellow warbler, yellow-rumped warbler
Tanagers, cardinals and allies – western tanager
New World sparrows – American tree swallow, California towhee, clay-colored sparrow, dark-eyed junco, fox sparrow, golden-crowned sparrow, lark sparrow, Lincoln's sparrow, Savannah sparrow, song sparrow, spotted towhee, swamp sparrow, white-crowned sparrow, white-throated sparrow
Grosbeaks – black-headed grosbeak
blackbirds, orioles and allies – Brewer's blackbird, brown-headed cowbird, Bullock's oriole, great-tailed grackle, hooded oriole, orchard oriole, red-winged blackbird, tri-colored blackbird, western meadowlark
Finches and allies – American goldfinch, house finch, lesser goldfinch, pine siskin
Old World sparrows – house sparrow
Exotics – mute swan, black swan

References

External links
Friends of Shollenberger
Petaluma Wetlands Alliance
Madrone Audubon
Sonoma Open Space

Parks in Sonoma County, California
Wetlands of California
Petaluma, California
Landforms of Sonoma County, California